The Women's U23 road race at the 2006 World University Cycling Championship took place on 25 March 2006. The Championships were hosted by the Belgian city of Antwerp. The road race consisted of 13 laps on a 6.8 km long circuit (88.4 km). In the race participated 33 athletes from 12 countries representing 3 continents.

Two days after winning silver in the time trial, the Dutchwomen Ellen van Dijk won gold in the road race leaving the silver to Eva Lutz from Germany and the bronze to Ludivine Henrion from the host country Belgium.

Final classification

See also

2006 World University Cycling Championship – Women's time trial

References

External links
International University Sports Federation – Cycling

World University Cycling Championships
2006 in women's road cycling
Cycling